Pitsea railway station is on the London, Tilbury and Southend line, serving the small town of Pitsea in the borough of Basildon, Essex. It is situated at a junction where a loop via  re-joins the main line via . Its three-letter station code is PSE.

It was originally opened in 1855 by the London, Tilbury and Southend Railway but was replaced by a new station on an adjacent site in 1888 when the line from Barking to Upminster fully opened. The station was renamed Pitsea for Vange in 1932, but reverted to the original name Pitsea in 1952.

The station and all trains serving it are currently operated by c2c.

Description 

The station is immediately south of the A13 road, adjacent to a level crossing which gives the main road access to the marshes area south of Pitsea and Basildon.

A new station building was opened in October 2005. Derek Twigg (then rail minister) attended for the "ribbon cutting" in November 2005. The building houses customer toilets and a retail unit. The station also has four automatic ticket gates.

The ticket office has two serving positions and uses the Tribute issuing system. Outside the ticket office is a self-service ticket machine that takes payment by both cash and cards.

Services

The typical Monday-Friday off-peak and Saturday service pattern is:
 2 trains per hour (tph) to London Fenchurch Street via Basildon;
 2 tph to London Fenchurch Street via Ockendon;
 2 tph to Shoeburyness;
 2 tph to Southend Central.

Additional services to/from London start/terminate here during peak times.

References

External links

Railway stations in Essex
DfT Category C2 stations
Transport in the Borough of Basildon
Former London, Tilbury and Southend Railway stations
Railway stations in Great Britain opened in 1855
Railway stations in Great Britain closed in 1888
Railway stations in Great Britain opened in 1888
Railway stations served by c2c